Charles Gerald McNamara (born 1900) was an Irish engineer active throughout mid-twentieth-century Ireland. He was the eldest son of T.F. McNamara.

Educated at the University School and Belvedere College, Dublin, he began his career with his younger brother N.P. McNamara at his father's practice. He earned a bachelor's degree in engineering from University College, Dublin in 1922; thereafter working in the Office of Public Works. In 1936, he established his own practice and incorporated his father's practice into his own following T.F. McNamara's death in 1947, creating the firm of C.G. McNamara & Partners with N.R. MacGovern as a new partner in the architectural division. He died in 1965 or 1966.

References

1900 births
Irish civil engineers
People from County Dublin
Alumni of University College Dublin
Year of death missing
People educated at Belvedere College